Sir Richard Douglas Powell, 1st Baronet,  (25 September 1842 – 15 December 1925) was a British physician, Physician Royal to Queen Victoria, Edward VII and George V, president of various medical societies, etc.

Powell studied medicine at University College, London, becoming house physician there under Dr William Jenner. He later worked at Brompton Hospital, the Marylebone Dispensary, the Evelina Hospital for Sick Children, Charing Cross Hospital and the Middlesex Hospital. 

In 1887 he was appointed as physician-extraordinary to Queen Victoria, later succeeding Jenner as physician-in-ordinary to Queen Victoria, Edward VII and George V.

He was elected President of the Medical Society of London (1891), the Clinical Society of London (1899–1901), the Royal Medical and Chirurgical Society (1904–1906) and the Royal College of Physicians (1905–1909). He delivered the Harveian Oration at the Royal College of Physicians in 1914.

He was created a baronet of Wimpole Street in 1897.

Family
Powell's elder daughter Dorothy Juliet Powell married in 1900 Edward Arthur Leadam, only son of W. Ward Leadam, MD.

References 

1842 births
1925 deaths
Alumni of University College London
19th-century English medical doctors
Powell, 1st Baronet
Knights Commander of the Royal Victorian Order
Presidents of the Royal College of Physicians
Knights of Grace of the Order of St John